Scott Frost (born 1975) is an American football coach and former player.

Scott Frost may also refer to:

Scott Frost (writer), American screenwriter and novelist
E. Scott Frost (born 1962), judge in Texas
Scott Frost (The Leftovers), fictional character
Scott Frost (horse) (1952–1983), American Standardbred trotter

Frost, Scott